This list of 2011 NFL draft early entrants consists of college football players who are juniors or redshirt sophomores who have been declared eligible to be selected in the 2011 NFL draft.  A player can forfeit his remaining NCAA eligibility and declare for the draft.  The deadline to declare for the 2011 draft was January 15, 2011.

Complete list of players
A record 56 players were granted special eligibility in 2011:

Number of players granted special eligibility by year
Undergraduates admitted to the NFL draft each year:

References

External links 
 2011 NFL Draft

2011 NFL draft early entrants
Draft early entrants